Al Bāţinah may refer to:

 Al Batinah Region, Oman
 Al Batinah, Yemen